Chelehban (also Romanized as Chelehbān; also known as Nūr‘alī Chelehbān) is a village in Zirtang Rural District, Kunani District, Kuhdasht County, Lorestan Province, Iran. At the 2006 census, its population was 675, in 130 families.

References 

Towns and villages in Kuhdasht County